Prague International Organ Festival is a festival for organ lovers, held annually in Prague, presenting a series of concerts by well-known organ virtuosos from all over the world. The inaugural edition was in 1996. The venue where the concerts are held is the stunning baroque St. James Basilica right beside Prague's Old Town square.

Organists
Czech republic: Aleš Bárta, Jaroslav Tůma, Jiří Ropek, Petr Rajnoha, Kamila Klugarová, Václav Uhlíř, Jan Hora
France: Marie-Claire Alain, Susan Landale, Eric Lebrun, Thierry Escaich, Daniel Roth, Naji Hakim
Germany: Johannes Geffert, Andreas Meisner
Italy: Luciano Zecca, Alessandro Bianchi
Poland: Roman Perucki, Waclaw Golonka, Robert Grudzien
Switzerland: Lionel Rogg, Guy Bovet, 
USA: Carol Williams, Karel Paukert, Stephen Tharp
Belgium: Eric Hallein, Kristiaan Seynhaave 
Canada: Philip Crozier
Slovakia: Imrich Szabó
Netherlands: Ben van Oosten
Austria: Gunther Rost, Peter Planyavsky
Japan: Hiroko Imai, Eiko Maria Yoshimura
Great Britain: David Titterington
Hungary: Zsuzsa Elekes
Norway: Halgier Schiager
Sweden: Juan Paradel Solé

See also
 Designblok

References

External links
 Official site of the festival

Pipe organ festivals
Music in Prague
Organ
Recurring events established in 1996
Festivals in Prague